Choi Eun-Kyung (born 23 September 1971) is a South Korean former field hockey player who competed in the 1996 Summer Olympics.

References

External links
 

1971 births
Living people
South Korean female field hockey players
Olympic field hockey players of South Korea
Field hockey players at the 1996 Summer Olympics
Olympic silver medalists for South Korea
Olympic medalists in field hockey
Medalists at the 1996 Summer Olympics